The 2019–20 Northern Arizona Lumberjacks men's basketball team represent Northern Arizona University in the 2019–20 NCAA Division I men's basketball season. The Lumberjacks, led by interim head coach Shane Burcar, played their home games at the Walkup Skydome in Flagstaff, Arizona, with their non-conference home games at Rolle Activity Center, and one at Findlay Toyota Center, as members of the Big Sky Conference.

On June 2, 2019, it was announced that head coach Jack Murphy would be stepping down, in order to take the associate head coaching position at his alma mater, Arizona. Assistant coach Shane Burcar was named the interim head coach for the 2019–20 season. Under Coach Burcar, the Lumberjacks posted their best season in five years. The 'Jacks 16 victories surpassed the program's total from the previous two years combined.

NAU concluded non-conference play with a 6–3 record, its best in nine years. That included back-to-back road wins at Utah Valley and UC Riverside. It was the program's first pair of consecutive non-conference road wins in nine years as well.

NAU began conference play 1–4 before winning their next five games. The five-game winning streak was the Lumberjacks' longest since the 2010–11 season. It included three straight victories from double-digit deficits and NAU's first Big Sky road sweep in six years at Southern Utah and Northern Colorado. On February 27, 2020, the 'Jacks shocked Montana, who entered the night in first-place, for a 57–56 victory. The victory was NAU's first against Montana since 2014.

The Lumberjacks finished the regular season in a tie for fifth-place in the Big Sky. As was the case all season, no lead was safe against NAU. The Lumberjacks battled back from a 15-point halftime deficit before seeing their season end in the first round against Idaho State. NAU led by their three all-conference honorees in their season finale. Brooks DeBisschop scored 17 points, while Bernie Andre and Cameron Shelton added 16 and 13 respectively. DeBisschop was also named CoSIDA First Team Academic All-American. He is the first Lumberjack men's basketball player to be a First Team Academic All-American.

Previous season
The Lumberjacks finished the 2018–19 season 10–21 overall, 8–12 in Big Sky play to finish in a tie for 8th place. In the Big Sky Conference tournament, they lost to Sacramento State in the first round.

Roster

Schedule and results

|-
!colspan=12 style=| Exhibition

|-
!colspan=12 style=| Non-conference regular season

|-
!colspan=12 style=| Big Sky regular season

|-
!colspan=12 style=| Big Sky tournament
|-

|-

Source

References

Northern Arizona Lumberjacks men's basketball seasons
Northern Arizona Lumberjacks
Northern Arizona Lumberjacks men's basketball
Northern Arizona Lumberjacks men's basketball